Palaquium edenii is a tree in the family Sapotaceae.

Description
Palaquium edenii has brownish twigs. The inflorescences bear up to three flowers.

Distribution and habitat
Palaquium edenii is endemic to Borneo, where it is known only from Sarawak. Its habitat is mixed dipterocarp forests.

References

edenii
Endemic flora of Borneo
Trees of Borneo
Flora of Sarawak
Plants described in 1909